is the 14th studio album by Japanese idol duo Wink, released by Polystar on July 5, 1995. It features the singles "Watashitachi Rashii Rule" and "Jive Into the Night (Yaban na Yoru ni) [Hyper Euro Mix]". Also included in the album are Japanese-language covers of Chuck Wild's "One Kiss at a Time", Chaka Khan's "Ain't Nobody", and Tasha's "My Turn". Flyin' High saw the duo abandon the retro pop sound from their two previous albums and return to their dance pop roots. It was also the first album since Aphrodite to feature songs by songwriter Neko Oikawa. The album became the duo's final studio release before disbanding in 1996 as a result of declining popularity and record sales.

The album peaked at No. 68 on Oricon's albums chart and sold over 10,000 copies.

Track listing

Charts

Footnotes

References

External links 
 
 
 

1995 albums
Wink (duo) albums
Japanese-language albums